The 13th Armored Division was an armored division of the United States Army in World War II.

History and combat chronicle
The division was activated on 15 October 1942 at Camp Beale, east of Marysville, California.

The 13th Armored, known as the Black Cats, landed at Le Havre, France, 29 January 1945. After performing occupation duties, the Division moved to Homberg near Kassel to prepare for combat under the Third Army, 5 April. At Altenkirchen, it was attached to the XVIII Airborne Corps and prepared for the Ruhr Pocket operation. The attack jumped off at Honnef, 10 April. After crossing the river Sieg at Siegburg, the 13th pushed north to Bergisch Gladbach, then toward Duisburg and Mettmann by 18 April.

Shifting south to Eschenau, the Division prepared for Bavarian operations. Starting from Parsberg, 26 April, the 13th crossed the Regen river, then the Danube at Matting and secured the area near Dünzling. On the 28th, elements closed in at Plattling and crossed the Isar River. Moderate to heavy resistance was met during this drive through southern Germany. The Division smashed into Braunau am Inn, Austria, 2 May, and the command post was set up in the house where Hitler was born. A bridgehead across the Inn was established at Marktl, but the river was not crossed as orders came to reassemble north of Inn River, 2 May.

Preparations were made for further advances when the war in Europe ended. The 13th remained in Germany until 25 June and left Le Havre, France, for home, 14 July 1945.

The division moved to Camp Cook, California after returning to the United States. It was training in amphibious operations at the time of the Japanese surrender. The men were aware that it was an open secret that they were likely to participate in the invasion of Japan. It was inactivated on 15 November 1945.

The division was reactivated in 1947, reflagged from the 19th Armored Division, which had been "placed on rolls", but not actually activated, during World War II. The 19th Armored Division was eventually activated just after the war, and allotted to the Sixth Army area of the Organized Reserves (specifically California, Oregon, and Arizona). In 1947, the 19th Armored Division was reflagged as the 13th Armored Division at California's request. In 1952, the division was reflagged as the 63rd Infantry Division in Los Angeles, California, and thus the 13th Armored Division was finally inactivated.

Composition 
The division was composed of the following units:

 Headquarters Company
 Combat Command A
 Combat Command B
 Reserve Command
 24th Tank Battalion
 45th Tank Battalion
 46th Tank Battalion
 16th Armored Infantry Battalion
 59th Armored Infantry Battalion
 67th Armored Infantry Battalion
 93rd Cavalry Reconnaissance Squadron (Mechanized)
 124th Armored Engineer Battalion
 153rd Armored Signal Company
 13th Armored Division Artillery
 496th Armored Field Artillery Battalion
 497th Armored Field Artillery Battalion
 498th Armored Field Artillery Battalion
 13th Armored Division Trains
 135th Armored Ordnance Maintenance Battalion
 83rd Armored Medical Battalion
 Military Police Platoon
 Band

Statistics

Casualties

Total battle casualties: 1,176
Killed in action: 214
Wounded in action: 912
Missing in action: 16
Prisoner of war: 34

Awards

Campaigns
Rhineland
Central Europe

Individual Awards
Distinguished Service Cross: 2
Silver Star: 6
Bronze Star: 102

References

External links
13th Armored Division Association
US Army Historical Site 
13th Armored Division Association Facebook Page

13th Armored Division, U.S.
Armored Division, U.S. 13th
Military units and formations established in 1942
1942 establishments in the United States
Military units and formations disestablished in 1952
1942 establishments in California